Tanner Conner (born March 20, 1998) is an American football tight end for the Miami Dolphins of the National Football League (NFL). He played college football at Idaho State.

Early life and high school
Conner grew up in Kent, Washington and attended Kentridge High School, where he played basketball and football and was a hurdler on the track team. As a senior, he won the state championship in the 300-meter hurdles. Conner was not originally recruited to play college football and committed to run track at Idaho State before receiving an offer to also play football at the school.

College career
Conner redshirted his freshman football season at Idaho State. Conner was named honorable mention All-Big Sky Conference after finishing his redshirt sophomore season with 47 receptions for 792 yards and eight touchdowns. He was named first-team All-Big Sky. after catching 34 passes for 685 yards and three touchdowns as a redshirt junior. Conner entered his redshirt senior season as the 12th-most athletic player in college football on sportswriter Bruce Feldman's annual "Freaks List". He finished the season with 42 receptions for 735 yards with four touchdowns and was named second-team All-Big Sky. After the conclusion of his college career, Conner was invited to play in the 2022 East–West Shrine Bowl.

Conner also was a member of Idaho State's track and field team. He competed in the 110 meter hurdles, 100 meters, and the 4 × 100 meters relay during the outdoor season and the 60 meter hurdles and the 60 meters during indoor events.

Professional career

Conner was signed by the Miami Dolphins as an undrafted free agent on April 30, 2022, shortly after the conclusion of the 2022 NFL Draft. He made the Dolphins' initial 53-man roster out of training camp.

Personal life
Conner's father, Andy, played college football at the University of Oregon.

References

External links
 
 Miami Dolphins bio
Idaho State Bengals football bio
Idaho State Bengals track and field bio

1998 births
Living people
Players of American football from Washington (state)
Sportspeople from Kent, Washington
American football wide receivers
Idaho State Bengals men's track and field athletes
Idaho State Bengals football players
Miami Dolphins players
American football tight ends